John James "J.J." Smith (9 May 1912 – 23 June 1987) was a Liberal party member of the House of Commons of Canada. Born in Storthoaks, Saskatchewan, Canada, he was educated at Fertile, Saskatchewan and became a farmer by career.

Smith became reeve of Storthoaks No. 31, Saskatchewan, the youngest person in Saskatchewan at that time to hold a municipal leadership.

He was first elected to Parliament at the Moose Mountain riding in the 1949 general election. After serving his only federal term, the 21st Canadian Parliament, Smith was defeated in the 1953 election by Edward McCullough of the Co-operative Commonwealth Federation. Smith was unsuccessful at winning the Moose Mountain riding in 1957 and 1958.

J.J. Smith died on 23 June 1987 at Winnipeg. He had resided in Burnaby, British Columbia at the time of his death.

References

External links
 

1912 births
1987 deaths
Canadian farmers
Liberal Party of Canada MPs
Members of the House of Commons of Canada from Saskatchewan